Saint Catherine of Alexandria is a painting by the Italian Renaissance artist Raphael. In the painting, Catherine of Alexandria is looking upward in ecstasy and leaning on a wheel, an allusion to the breaking wheel (or Catherine wheel) of her martyrdom.

It was painted , towards the end of Raphael's sojourn in Florence, and shows the young artist in a transitional phase. The depiction of religious passion in the painting is still reminiscent of Pietro Perugino, but the graceful contrapposto of Catherine's pose is typical of the influence of Leonardo da Vinci on Raphael, and is believed to be an echo of Leonardo's lost painting Leda and the Swan.In 2022 the painting was included in an exhibition held by the  National Gallery.

Painting materials
Raphael employed the usual Renaissance pigments such as natural ultramarine, madder lake, ochres and lead-tin yellow. He also mixed a special kind of finely powdered glass into several pigments to speed up the drying of the oil paints.

This picture was partially used on the cover of The Smashing Pumpkins album Mellon Collie and the Infinite Sadness.

See also
List of paintings by Raphael
Saint Catherine (Caravaggio)

References

External links

1500s paintings
Paintings by Raphael
Religious paintings
Collections of the National Gallery, London
Paintings of Catherine of Alexandria